Tazeh Kand (also Romanized as Tāzeh Kand; also known as Maḩmūdābād and Taza-kend) is a village in Chelleh Khaneh Rural District, Sufian District, Shabestar County, East Azerbaijan Province, Iran. At the 2006 census, its population was 973, in 229 families.

References 

Populated places in Shabestar County